Vittoriosa Stars Football Club are a Maltese football club from the seaside town of Birgu, which currently plays in the Maltese Challenge League. They were founded in 1906.

History
Vittoriosa were promoted to the Maltese Premier League in 2009, but were excluded before the start of the season as a result of a match-fixing scandal. In 2010, they defeated San Gwann 1–0 in a promotion playoff to gain promotion to the top division for the second consecutive season. They were relegated the following year, leading to the departure of their coach Winston Muscat.

Vittoriosa were denied the First Division championship in 2013 after losing their final round match 4–1 to Pietà Hotspurs F.C. meant they were tied on points with Naxxar Lions. They lost the championship decider 2–1 to Naxxar Lions, but still clinched another promotion to the top flight. They were relegated from the 2013–14 Maltese Premier League on the final day of the season, again losing to Naxxar Lions by a score of 3–1, which allowed the Lions to jump them in the table.

Olivier Spiteri was manager from 2012 to 2014.

Vittoriosa played the remainder of the decade in the first division, maintaining their second-tier status in 2019 after winning a relegation playoff against Mgarr United F.C.

Current squad

Personnel

Coaching staff

References

 
Football clubs in Malta
Association football clubs established in 1906
1906 establishments in Malta